William Temple (12 December 1914 – 2006) was an English professional footballer who played in the Football League for Aldershot, Carlisle United, Grimsby Town and Gateshead. He played in both inside forward positions.

References

1914 births
2006 deaths
People from Winlaton
Footballers from Tyne and Wear
Footballers from County Durham
English footballers
Association football inside forwards
Newbiggin Juniors F.C. players
Newbiggin West End F.C. players
Aldershot F.C. players
Carlisle United F.C. players
Grimsby Town F.C. players
Gateshead F.C. players
English Football League players